The South Ossetian Autonomous Oblast was an autonomous oblast of the Soviet Union created within the Georgian SSR on April 20, 1922. Its autonomy was revoked on December 11, 1990 by the Supreme Soviet of the Georgian SSR, leading to the First South Ossetian War. Currently, its territory is controlled by the breakaway Republic of South Ossetia.

The population of the South Ossetian AO consisted mostly of ethnic Ossetians, who made up roughly 66% of the 100,000 people living there in 1989, and Georgians, who constituted a further 29% of the population as of 1989.

History

Establishment
Following the Russian revolution, the area of modern South Ossetia became part of the Democratic Republic of Georgia. In 1918, conflict began between the landless Ossetian peasants living in Shida Kartli (Interior Georgia), who were influenced by Bolshevism and demanded ownership of the lands they worked, and the Menshevik government backed ethnic Georgian aristocrats, who were legal owners. Although the Ossetians were initially discontented with the economic policies of the central government, the tension soon transformed into ethnic conflict. The first Ossetian rebellion began February 1, 1918, when three Georgian princes were killed and their land was seized by the Ossetians. The central government of Tiflis retaliated by sending the National Guard to the area. However, the Georgian unit retreated after they had engaged the Ossetians. Ossetian rebels then proceeded to occupy the town of Tskhinvali and began attacking ethnic Georgian civilian population. During uprisings in 1919 and 1920, the Ossetians were covertly supported by Soviet Russia, but even so, were defeated. Between 3,000 and 7,000 Ossetians  were killed during the crushing of the 1920 uprising; according to Ossetian sources ensuing hunger and epidemics were the causes of death of more than 13,000 people.

There was discussion to create a united republic for Ossetians, incorporating both North and South Ossetia. This was indeed proposed by Ossetian authorities in July 1925 to Anastas Mikoyan, the head of the kraikom (Bolshevik committee in charge of the Caucasus). Sergo Orjonikidze had opposed incorporating the proposed state into Russia, fearing it would lead to unrest in Georgia, so Mikoyan asked Stalin about placing all of Ossetia within Georgia. Stalin initially approved, but later decided against it, fearing it would lead to other ethnic groups in Russia demanding to leave the RSFSR, which would destroy the federation. Thus South Ossetia was made subordinate to Georgia, while North Ossetia remained in the RSFSR.

End of the South Ossetian AO
Concerned with the upswing in Georgian nationalism, exemplified by Zviad Gamsakhurdia, the South Ossetian AO began to look to leave Georgia. On December 11, 1990 it declared itself to be a Democratic Soviet Republic under direct control of the Soviet Union. The same day the Georgian parliament dissolved the South Ossetian AO, reducing it to a region of Georgia.

Culture and society

Demographics
The main ethnic group of the South Ossetian AO was the Ossetians. Throughout the entire existence of the region, the Ossetians represented a stable majority of over two-thirds of the population. Georgians constituted the only significant minority, with between 25 and 30% of the population. No other ethnic group constituted more than 3% of the total population. About half of all families in the region were of mixed Ossetian–Georgian heritage. Considerable numbers of Ossetians lived elsewhere in Georgia as well, with upwards of 100,000 spread across the country.

Language
Most people in the South Ossetian AO spoke Ossetian, with smaller numbers using Russian and Georgian; all three were official languages of the region. Though Georgian was the language of the Georgian SSR, of which South Ossetia was part of, most people in the South Ossetian AO did not speak the language; as late as 1989 only 14% knew Georgian, and it was a proposal in August 1989 to make Georgian the only official language of public use that instigated the independence movement. Originally written in Cyrillic, Ossetian was switched to a Latin-based script in 1923 as part of the Latinization campaign of the Soviet Union. This was abandoned in 1938 with nearly every Latinized language switching to a Cyrillic script. Ossetian and Abkhaz were the only exceptions; both used a Georgian script (only in South Ossetia; North Ossetia used Cyrillic). This policy lasted until 1953 when they abandoned the Georgian script for a Cyrillic-based one.

See also
 Provisional Administration of South Ossetia
 South Ossetian Regional Committee of the Communist Party of Georgia

Notes

Bibliography

 
 
 
 
 
 
 
 
 
 
 
 
 

South Ossetia
Autonomous oblasts of the Soviet Union
Georgian Soviet Socialist Republic
States and territories established in 1922
States and territories disestablished in 1990